This is a list of the presidents of the Senate of Italy from the Kingdom of Sardinia to the present day.

The President of the Senate of the Republic is the presiding officer of the Italian Senate. The President of the Senate is the second highest-ranking office of the Italian Republic (after the President of the Republic).

The President of the Senate represents the Senate to external bodies, regulates debates in the Senate chamber by applying its regulations and the rules of the Italian Constitution, and regulates all the activities of its components in order to ensure that it functions correctly.

The President of the Senate, along with the President of the Chamber of Deputies, must be consulted by the President of the Republic before the latter can dissolve one or both the chambers of the Italian Parliament.

Kingdom of Sardinia (1848–1861)
 Parties

Kingdom of Italy (1861–1946)
 Parties
1861–1912:

1912–1929:

1929–1943:

1943–1946:

Italian Republic (1946–present)
 Parties
1948–1994:

1994–present:

Timeline

Kingdom of Italy (1861–1946)

Italian Republic (1946–present)

See also 
 Senate of the Republic (Italy)
 List of presidents of the Chamber of Deputies (Italy)

References 

 
Presidents of the Italian Senate
Italy

pl:Przewodniczący Senatu Włoch